Lisiče is a village in the municipality of Čaška, North Macedonia.

Demographics
Toward the end of the 19th and beginning of the 20th centuries, Lisiče traditionally was a mixed Orthodox Macedonian, Macedonian Muslim (Torbeš) and Muslim Albanian village. During the Balkan Wars (1912-1913) some of the Muslim population left the village and resettled in the villages of Gorno Jabolčište and Dolno Jabolčište. Muslim Macedonians from Lisiče left the village after the Second World War.

According to the 2021 census, the village had a total of 128 inhabitants. Ethnic groups in the village include:

Macedonians 126
Albanians 2

References

Villages in Čaška Municipality
Macedonian Muslim villages